The Northern Macedonian dialects are one of three groups of Macedonian. The group is located in the northern and northeastern areas of North Macedonia,  surrounding the cities and towns of Tetovo, Skopje, Kumanovo, Kratovo, Kriva Palanka, and Sveti Nikole. The group of Northern Macedonian dialects is divided into two subgroups: the western group and the eastern group.

Dialects

Western group
Tetovo dialect
Skopska Crna Gora dialect
Gora dialect

Eastern group
Kumanovo dialect 
Kratovo dialect
Kriva Palanka dialect
Ovče Pole dialect

Dialects of the Macedonian language